Sreekanteswaram Mahadeva Temple is a Hindu temple situated in the heart of Thiruvananthapuram in the Indian state of Kerala. This temple is more than 700 years old. It is dedicated to Shiva and is within 3 km of the Central Railway Station, bus station, East Fort and Sree Padmanabhaswamy Temple.

An older temple of Lord Shiva and Vishnu has a name similar to this one at Puthanchantha, Thiruvananthapuram. That temple is known as Pazhaya Sreekanteswaram Temple.

Sreekanteswaram Mahadeva Temple is administered by Travancore Devaswom Board.

Legend

The legend is that an old woman sweeper of Pazhaya Sreekanteswaram temple distinguished the Swyambhoo (self manifested) Shiva Linga idol while she was resting at this place. She got 'Darshan' (vision) of Lord Shiva at the spot  at the temple site.

Goddess Parvati Devi's (Lord Shiva's wife) is also presence in this temple even though there is no shrine for her. The deity is called Gowri Shankara in this belief.

Many devotees attend the Nirmalya Darshan (which is witnessing the deity with the decoration of previous night when the temple reopens at 4 AM) and Mrithyunjaya Homam, which are believed to be benevolent for the devotees.

Deities and Sub-Deities

The principal deity is Lord Shiva. Sub-Deities are Maha Ganapathy, Lord Murugan, Anjaneya Swamy, Sree Krishna, Swamy Ayyappan, Nagarajah.

Main Offerings
Ganapathy Homam, Mrithyunjaya Homam, Mrithyunjayarchana, Abhishekam, Dhara, Pushpabhishekam, Neerajanam, Venna Charthu for AnjaneyaSwamy, Ashtothararchana, Sahasranamarchana, Nateshalankaram and many more.

Festivals
The annual festival lasts for ten days and will be celebrated  in the Malayalam month Dhanu (Dec-Jan). The Aarattu will be on Thiruvathira Star day which is considered as the birthday of Lord Shiva.
Shivarathri festival is also celebrated in a grand manner. Anointing the idol of Lord Shiva with pure ghee throughout the day is performed on that day.

See also 

 Pazhaya Sreekanteswaram Temple
 Sreekanteswaram
 Sasthamangalam Mahadevar Temple
 Sasthamangalam Mahadevar Temple
 Sreevaraham Lakshmi Varaha Temple, Thiruvananthapuram
 Peroor Sree Krishna Swamy Temple
 Anandavalleeswaram Temple,Kollam
 List of Hindu temples in Kerala

References

External links
 

Hindu temples in Thiruvananthapuram
Shiva temples in Kerala
108 Shiva Temples